Mpho Etam Mbebe (born 14 April 1992) is a South African footballer who played as a midfielder.

Club career

Royal Eagles
In January 2014, Mbebe joined Sivutsa Stars in the National First Division.

When Sivutsa Stars was bought out by millionaire couple Shauwn and Sbu Mpisane and renamed as Royal Eagles, Mbebe was one of the players retained.

SuperSport United
In February 2015, Mbebe signed a 2.5 year contract with SuperSport United, despite being on trial at the Black Leopards. Following the signing, Black Leopards launched a complaint against SuperSport United, claiming he had been trialling with them (even scoring a brace against SuperSport) and was in the process of signing with them. The coach Gordon Igesund praised Mbebe, believing he has what it takes to become the next big thing for his side and claiming that he will take the league by storm.

References

1992 births
Living people
South African soccer players
Association football midfielders
SuperSport United F.C. players
Place of birth missing (living people)
Sivutsa Stars F.C. players
Royal Eagles F.C. players